Corey Robert Flynn (born 5 January 1981) is a New Zealand rugby union player who currently plays for West Coast in the Heartland Championship. He plays in the position of hooker.

Career

Club career

Flynn previously played provincial for Southland until he moved to Canterbury in 2003; has played Super Rugby rugby for the Crusaders; and has played in Top 14 for Toulouse.

On 29 February 2016 it was announced that Flynn would sign for Glasgow Warriors at the end of the 2015–16 season.

Flynn had already played in Scotstoun with Toulouse and stated: "When I played at Scotstoun last season, the atmosphere was fantastic and it shows the club has a really good support base. I jumped at the chance to join the Warriors after chatting to Gregor and I'm good friends with Scotland full-back Sean Maitland and he couldn't say enough good things about Glasgow."

On 26 May 2017 it was announced that Flynn was no longer contracted by the Warriors.

International career

Flynn made his international debut for the All Blacks against Canada after a surprise selection ahead of Anton Oliver in the 2003 Rugby World Cup. He has also played for New Zealand Maori and the Junior All Blacks. On 31 May 2006, Flynn was named captain of the Junior All Blacks after Reuben Thorne declined the role.

Biography

He was educated at Southland Boys' High School.

Flynn comes from a family with a long history in rugby with his father and two uncles playing for Southland Rugby. One of his uncles, Robbie Flynn, played rugby for the United States, Aaron Flynn, also played for the Crusaders from 1998 to 2002.

After rugby 
He returned in 2021/22 for season 2 of Match Fit. He revealed that he lost much of his skills as a lineout thrower, and his career had been marred by shoulder, elbow and ankle injuries, but his anger and frustrations spills over as they were misdirected towards coaches, and also developed drinking problems until he recovered in 2011.

References

External links
Crusaders profile

Corey talking about Earth Hour

1981 births
New Zealand international rugby union players
Canterbury rugby union players
People educated at Southland Boys' High School
Living people
Ngāi Tahu people
Crusaders (rugby union) players
New Zealand rugby union players
Rugby union players from Invercargill
Rugby union hookers
Māori All Blacks players
Southland rugby union players
New Zealand expatriate rugby union players
New Zealand expatriate sportspeople in France
Expatriate rugby union players in France
Stade Toulousain players
Glasgow Warriors players
Expatriate rugby union players in Scotland
New Zealand expatriate sportspeople in Scotland